St. Andrew's Cemetery may refer to:

St. Andrew's Cemetery (Grand Rapids, Michigan), listed on the National Register of Historic Places in Kent County, Michigan
St. Andrew's Cemetery (Walden, New York), listed on the National Register of Historic Places in Orange County, New York
St. Andrew's Episcopal Church and Cemetery, listed on the National Register of Historic Places in Woodleaf, North Carolina